The German Luftwaffe of the Wehrmacht had seven Jagdfliegerschulen or Fighter Pilot Schools.

Jagdfliegerschule Werneuchen or Jagdfliegerschule 1

Jagdfliegerschule Werneuchen was formed on 1 November 1937 in Werneuchen consisting of 3 Staffeln (squadrons). The school was renamed to Jagdfliegerschule 1 on 15 January 1940. On 17 December 1941 an operation squadron (Einsatz-Staffel) was formed in Jever. This operational squadron then became part of an ad hoc formation called Jagdgruppe Losigkeit, led by Hauptmann Fritz Losigkeit, to protect a group of warships moving to Norway. Jagdgruppe Losigkeit was renamed to 10./Jagdgeschwader 1 in late March 1942. The entire school was renamed on 15 December 1942 and became Jagdgeschwader 101.

Commanding officers
Oberst Theodor Osterkamp, 1 November 1937 – 20 November 1939
Oberstleutnant Otto-Friedrich Freiherr von Houwald, 20 November 1939 – 15 December 1942

Jagdfliegerschule Schleißheim or Jagdfliegerschule 2
Jagdfliegerschule Schleißheim was formed on 1 April 1934 in Schleißheim and disbanded again on 9 June 1936. It was recreated again on 1 April 1939 consisting of 3 Staffeln (squadrons). The school was renamed to Jagdfliegerschule 2 on 15 January 1940. An operational Staffel was formed in 1941 at Zerbst. The Staffel was relocated to Düsseldorf-Lohausen on 24 June 1941 and to Kiel-Holtenau on 5 July 1941. The Staffel was disbanded at the end of 1941. The entire school was renamed on 24 February 1943 and became Jagdgeschwader 102.

Commanding officers
Hauptmann Gottlob Müller, 1 April 1934 – 31 August 1934
Major Josef Mai, 1 September 1934 – 4 October 1935
Oberstleutnant Gerd von Massow, 5 October 1935 – 9 June 1936
Oberst Hermann Frommherz, 1 April 1939 – 30 June 1941
Major Ernst Freiherr von Berg, June 1941 – 4 January 1943
Major Jürgen Roth, 5 January 1943 – 24 February 1943

Jagdfliegerschule Stolp-Reitz or Jagdfliegerschule 3
Jagdfliegerschule 3 was redesignated Jagdgeschwader 103 on 7 December 1942.

Commanding officers
Oberstleutnant Siegfried Lehmann, 19 September 1939 – 21 December 1940
Oberstleutnant Eitel-Friedrich Roediger von Manteuffel, 22 December 1940 – 28 May 1941
Oberstleutnant Richard Kraut, 29 May 1941 – 28 October 1942
Major Herbert Ihlefeld, 29 October 1942 – 6 December 1942

Jagdfliegerschule Fürth or Jagdfliegerschule 4
Jagdfliegerschule 4 was redesignated Jagdgeschwader 104 on 19 March 1943.

Commanding officers
Oberstleutnant Rudolf Stoltenhoff, 16 January 1940 – 11 October 1940
Oberstleutnant Max Ibel, 12 October 1940 – 5 June 1941
Oberstleutnant Karl Vieck, 6 June 1941 – 30 June 1941
Major Hubertus von Bonin, 1 July 1941 – 10 October 1941
Major Hans Trübenbach, 15 October 1941 – 19 March 1943

Jagdfliegerschule Wien-Schwechat or Jagdfliegerschule 5
Jagdfliegerschule 5 was redesignated Jagdgeschwader 105 on 27 January 1943.

Commanding officers
Generalmajor Eduard Ritter von Schleich, 15 December 1939 – 4 October 1940
Oberstleutnant Hubert Merhart von Bernegg, 8 October 1940 – 10 December 1942
Major Richard Leppla, 15 December 1942 – 24 February 1943

Jagdfliegerschule 6
Jagdfliegerschule 6 was created on 9 November 1942 in Lachen-Speyersdorf and was redesignated as Jagdgeschwader 106 on 19 March 1943.

Commanding officers
Major Henning Strümpell, 9 November 1942 – 19 March 1943

Jagdfliegerschule 7

Commanding officers
Major Georg Meyer, 12 October 1942 – 25 January 1943

Bibliography

Military units and formations of the Luftwaffe